Fast Light Toolkit (FLTK, pronounced fulltick) is a cross-platform widget (graphical control element) library for graphical user interfaces (GUIs), developed by Bill Spitzak and others. Made to accommodate 3D graphics programming, it has an interface to OpenGL, but it is also suitable for general GUI programming.

Using its own widget, drawing and event systems abstracted from the underlying system-dependent code, it allows for writing programs which look the same on all supported operating systems.

FLTK is free and open-source software, licensed under GNU Lesser General Public License (LGPL) with an added clause permitting static linking from applications with incompatible licenses.

In contrast to user interface libraries like GTK, Qt, and wxWidgets, FLTK uses a more lightweight design and restricts itself to GUI functionality. Because of this, the library is very small (the FLTK "Hello World" program is around 100 KiB), and is usually statically linked. It also avoids complex macros, separate code preprocessors, and use of some advanced C++ features: templates, exceptions, and run-time type information (RTTI) or, for FLTK 1.x, namespaces. Combined with the modest size of the package, this makes it relatively easy to learn for new users.

These advantages come with corresponding disadvantages. FLTK offers fewer widgets than most GUI toolkits and, because of its use of non-native widgets, does not have native look-and-feel on any platform.

Meaning of the name
FLTK was originally designed to be compatible with the Forms Library written for Silicon Graphics (SGI) machines (a derivative of this library called XForms is still used quite often). In that library, all functions and structures start with fl_. This naming was extended to all new methods and widgets in the C++ library, and this prefix FL was taken as the name of the library. After FL was released as open source, it was discovered that searching "FL" on the Internet was a problem, because it is also the abbreviation for Florida. After much debating and searching for a new name for the toolkit, which was already in use by several people, Bill Spitzak came up with Fast Light Tool Kit (FLTK).

Architecture
FLTK is an object-oriented widget toolkit written in the programming language C++. While GTK is mainly optimized for the X Window System, FLTK works on other platforms, including Microsoft Windows (interfaced with the Windows API), and OS X (interfaced with Quartz). A Wayland back-end is being discussed. FLTK2 has gained experimental support for optionally using the cairo graphics library.

Language bindings
A library written in one programming language may be used in another language if language bindings are written. FLTK has a range of bindings for various languages.

FLTK was mainly designed for, and is written in, the programming language C++. However, bindings exist for other languages, for example Lua, Perl, Python, Ruby, Rust and Tcl.

For FLTK 1.x, this example creates a window with an Okay button:
#include <FL/Fl.H>
#include <FL/Fl_Window.H>
#include <FL/Fl_Button.H>

int main(int argc, char *argv[]) {
   Fl_Window* w = new Fl_Window(330, 190);
   new Fl_Button(110, 130, 100, 35, "Okay");
   w->end();
   w->show(argc, argv);
   return Fl::run();
}

GUI designers
FLTK includes Fast Light User Interface Designer (FLUID), a graphical GUI designer that generates C++ source and header files.

Use

Many programs and projects use FLTK, including:
 Nanolinux, 14 MB Linux distribution
 XFDOS, a FreeDOS-based distribution with a GUI, porting Nano-X and FLTK
 Agenda VR3, a Linux-based personal digital assistant with software based on FLTK.
 third-party Agenda VR3 software
 Amnesia: The Dark Descent, by Frictional Games uses FLTK as its launcher application
 MwendanoWD, Logic puzzle for personal computer by YPH.
 Audio:
 Fldigi, amateur radio software, allows data transmission and text chat via digital modes such as PSK31
 Giada, looper, micro-sequencer, sample player software, open-source
 Prodatum, synthesizer preset editor, uses a lifelike interface design
 ZynAddSubFX, an open-source software synthesizer
 DiSTI GL Studio, human-machine interface development tool
 Engineering:
 ForcePAD, an intuitive tool to visualise the behavior of structures subject to loading and boundary conditions
 Gmsh, an open-source finite element mesh generator
 RoboCIM, software to simulate and control operation of a servo robot system and external devices
 Equinox Desktop Environment (EDE)
 FlBurn optical disc burning software for Linux
 Graphics:
 Avimator, a Biovision Hierarchy (BVH) editor
 CinePaint, deep-paint software, migrating from GTK to FLTK, open-source
 ITK-SNAP, software application for medical image segmentation, open-source
 Nuke, a digital compositing program. Until version 5, now replaced by Qt
 Open Movie Editor
 OpenVSP, NASA parametric aircraft sketching, recently open-sourced
 PosteRazor, open-source poster printing software for Windows, OS X, Linux
 Tilemap Studio, An open-source tilemap editor for Game Boy, Color, Advance, DS, and SNES projects
 SmallBASIC, Windows port
 Web browsers:
 Dillo, Dillo-2 was based on FLTK-2, abandoning this FLTK branch, with no official release, was a major cause of Dillo-3 being started, using FLTK1.3
 Fifth, replicates functioning of early Opera
 NetRider
 Brain Visualizer: An open-source interactive visualizer for large-scale 3D brain models. Part of the Brain Organization Simulation System (BOSS) developed at Stony Brook University
 X window managers:
 FLWM
 miwm

Versions

This version history is an example of the sometimes tumultuous nature of open-source development.

1.0.x
This is a prior stable version, now unmaintained.

1.1.x
This is a prior stable version, now unmaintained.

2.0 branch
This was a development branch, long thought to be the next step in FLTK's evolution, with many new features and a cleaner programming style. It never achieved stability, and development has largely ceased. The branch is inactive now.

1.2.x
This was an attempt to take some of the best features of 2.0 and merge them back into the more popular 1.1 branch. It is no longer developed.

1.3.x
Current stable release. Provides UTF-8 support.

1.4.x
Current development branch. Adds more features to 1.3.

3.0 branch
This branch is mostly a conceptual model for future work. Now inactive.

See also

 GTK
 gtkmm (C++ binding of GTK)
 FOX toolkit
 IUP (software) - a multi-platform toolkit to build native graphical user interfaces
 Juce
 Qt (software)
 Visual Component Framework (VCF)
 Widget toolkit
 wxWidgets - cross platform open source C++ widgets toolkit developed by community
 Ultimate++
 List of widget toolkits

References

External links
 

 
Cross-platform free software
Free computer libraries
Free software programmed in C++
Software that uses Cairo (graphics)
Software using the LGPL license
Widget toolkits
X-based libraries